"Monkey" is a US number-one hit song by English singer and songwriter George Michael. It was released as a single in 1988 and reached number-one on the US Billboard Hot 100 and number 13 on the UK Singles Chart. "Monkey" debuted at number 42 on 9 July 1988, reaching number-one for two weeks, beginning on 27 August 1988.

"Monkey" became George Michael's sixth solo single reaching number-one in the US, and the fourth single to do so from the Faith album. George Michael joined Michael Jackson and Whitney Houston as three artists who all had four or more consecutive number one singles during the 1987–88 era, from one album (Michael Jackson scored five number-one hits from a single album (Bad) while Whitney Houston scored seven consecutive number-one hits from two albums).

"Monkey" also reached number-one in the US Hot Dance Club Play chart for two weeks and became his first dance number-one. When the song was released as a single, the single version was remixed by Jimmy Jam and Terry Lewis.

Background

In an introspective interview about the album in 2010, George told to the song was inspired by a friend of his dealing with drug and alcohol addiction but didn't know how to help her. He used the term Monkey to refer to the drug and alcohol addiction. He asked her friend: Do you like the Monkey or do you Love Me?.

Critical reception
Pan-European magazine Music & Media wrote, "One of the most overtly funky, disco-oriented tracks on the LP Faith. A hard hitting dance number."

Music video

The official music video for the song was directed by Andy Morahan and choreographed by Paula Abdul. It comprises footage of George's 1988 tour (including scenes of him performing intense choreography with a female dancer) and him performing the song in a simple white t-shirt and black hat against a white background. Some of the scenes are shown in grey scale, with the tour footage being shown with tinted blue lights all over.

Track listing
 7"
 "Monkey (7-Inch Edit)" – 4:47
 "Monkey (A'Cappella)" – 3:40

 US 12" – Columbia Records 44 07849
 "Monkey (Extended Version)" – 8:06
 "Monkey (A'Cappella)" – 3:40
 "Monkey (Extra Beats)" – 3:30

 CD
 "Monkey (Extended Version)" – 8:06
 "Monkey (A'Cappella)" – 3:40
 "Monkey (Extra Beats)" – 3:30
 "Monkey (7-Inch Edit)" – 4:47

Charts

Weekly charts

Year-end charts

See also
 List of number-one dance singles of 1988 (U.S.)

References

1987 songs
1988 singles
Billboard Hot 100 number-one singles
Cashbox number-one singles
Epic Records singles
George Michael songs
Music videos directed by Andy Morahan
RPM Top Singles number-one singles
Song recordings produced by Jimmy Jam and Terry Lewis
Song recordings produced by George Michael
Songs written by George Michael
Songs about drugs